Stefan Karajovanovic (born April 16, 1999) is a Canadian professional soccer player who plays as a forward.

Early life
Karajovanovic began playing youth soccer with the Association Soccer de Hull. In 2015, he joined the Montreal Impact Academy, where he played for four months before joining the Ottawa Fury FC Academy, due to moving to Ottawa for school.

University career
In 2017, he began attending Carleton University in Ottawa, where he played for the Ravens soccer team. He was named an OUA first-team all-star as a rookie. During his three seasons at Carleton, he scored 35 goals in 37 appearances.

Club career
Karajovanovic was a member of the Ottawa Fury FC Academy, where he made his semi-professional debut in the Première Ligue de soccer du Québec playing five matches during the 2016 season, while also appearing in 11 reserve team games scoring four goals.

In 2017 and 2018, he played for FC Gatineau in the PLSQ. During the 2017 season, he broke his collarbone which limited him to five total combined appearances in which he scored four goals (two goals in two league appearances), but returned the following season with much greater success, scoring 14 goals in 12 games. He won the Ballon de bronze (Bronze Ball) as the league's third best player in 2018.

In 2019, he joined AS Blainville in the PLSQ, where he won the league championship.

He was selected 5th overall in the 2019 CPL–U Sports Draft by York9 FC of the Canadian Premier League. He trained with the club for five days, but the club did not have a roster spot for him, so he did not sign for the 2020 season. Afterwards, he joined Atlético Ottawa for training, but did not join them for the 2020 season either. 

Instead for the 2020 season, he joined PLSQ club Ottawa South United, after switching over from defending champion Blainville.

At the 2021 CPL-U Sports Draft, he was selected seventh overall by the HFX Wanderers FC. In June, he signed with the club for the 2021 season. He made his debut on June 26, 2021 against Pacific FC. He scored his first professional goal on September 3 against Forge FC. He departed the club at the end of the season.

Several Canadadian Premier League clubs expressed interest in him for the 2022 season, however, in March 2022, he chose to sign with Toronto FC II in MLS Next Pro, stating "when my eyes saw Toronto FC, I didn't think twice!". He scored his first goal on July 18 against Philadelphia Union II. He departed the club after the season, after the club declined his contract option.

In December 2022, it was announced that he would be going on trial with Serbian SuperLiga club FK Napredak Kruševac. Then, in February 2023, he went on trial with Pacific FC as part of their pre-season camp.

Personal
His family is of Serbian origin. His grandfather played professional soccer in Bosnia and Serbia.

Career statistics

References

1999 births
Living people
Association football forwards
Canadian soccer players
Soccer people from Quebec
Sportspeople from Gatineau
Canadian people of Serbian descent
Ottawa Fury FC players
Carleton Ravens men's soccer players
HFX Wanderers FC players
Première ligue de soccer du Québec players
Canadian Premier League players
HFX Wanderers FC draft picks
York United FC draft picks
Ottawa South United players
FC Gatineau players
A.S. Blainville players
Toronto FC II players
MLS Next Pro players